Cristian Hernán Revainera (born July 14, 1982 in Argentina) is an Argentine footballer currently playing for CA Pantoja in the Liga Dominicana de Fútbol.

In his debut match, with Deportes La Serena, in the "Night Granate" makes 2 goals, achieving victory over Naval Talcahuano.

Teams
  Berazatégui 2000–2001
  Defensa y Justicia 2002–2003
  Boca Juniors 2003–2004
  Argentino de Quilmes 2004–2005
  Platense 2005–2006
  Alvarado de Mar del Plata 2006
  Temperley 2007
  NK Čelik Zenica 2008
  Tiro Federal 2009
  Tiro Federal y Deportivo Morteros 2009–2011
  3 de Febrero 2012
  Deportes La Serena 2013
  Berazategui 2013–2015
  Atlético Pantoja 2016–

External links
 
 

1982 births
Living people
Argentine footballers
Boca Juniors footballers
Tiro Federal footballers
Club Atlético Platense footballers
Defensa y Justicia footballers
Deportes La Serena footballers
Club Atlético 3 de Febrero players
Primera B de Chile players
Argentine Primera División players
Argentine expatriate footballers
Expatriate footballers in Chile
Expatriate footballers in Paraguay
Expatriate footballers in Bosnia and Herzegovina
Expatriate footballers in the Dominican Republic
Association football defenders